Jurklošter is a settlement in the Municipality of Laško in eastern Slovenia. The area is part of the traditional region of Styria. It is now included with the rest of the municipality in the Savinja Statistical Region.

Name
The settlement was first attested around 1145 as Geyrowe (later forms: de Giurio, Gyriov, Geyrach), all referring to the Slovenian prefix Jur- '(Saint) George'. The suffix -klošter means 'monastery' and the name Jurklošter therefore refers to a religious edifice dedicated to Saint George. The pre-1972 name of the settlement, Mišji Dol, also refers to a monastery because it literally means 'monks' valley' (mišji < meniški 'monk') (but cf. Mišji Dol in the Municipality of Šmartno pri Litiji, literally 'mouse valley').

The name of the settlement was changed from Mišji Dol to Jurklošter in 1972.

Cultural heritage

Charterhouse
It was the site of a large charterhouse (Carthusian monastery), of which the parish church, a later mansion and a defence tower remain. The monastery was founded in the 12th century. The church is dedicated to Saint Maurice and belongs to the Roman Catholic Diocese of Celje.

References

External links

Jurklošter on Geopedia

Populated places in the Municipality of Laško
Carthusian monasteries in Slovenia